Ned Carroll is an American politician serving in the Minnesota House of Representatives since 2023. A member of the Minnesota Democratic-Farmer-Labor Party (DFL), Carroll represents District 42A in the northeastern Twin Cities metropolitan area, which includes the cities of Plymouth and Maple Grove in Hennepin County, Minnesota.

Early life, education and career 
Carroll received his bachelor's degree in economics and political science from Cornell College in Iowa, and his master's in public policy analysis from Rutger's University. He earned a Juris Doctor from the University of Iowa College of Law, and works as a senior assistant attorney for Hennepin County.

Carroll served on the Plymouth City Council for eight years prior to his election to the legislature, and served as deputy mayor from 2019 to 2022.

Minnesota House of Representatives 
Carroll was first elected to the Minnesota House of Representatives in 2022, after redistricting created a new Plymouth-based legislative district. He serves on the Capital Investment, Climate and Energy Finance and Policy, Health Finance and Policy, and Judiciary Finance and Civil Law Committees.

Electoral history

Personal life 
Carroll lives in Plymouth, Minnesota with his wife, Maureen, and has three children.

References

External links 

Members of the Minnesota House of Representatives

Living people
Year of birth missing (living people)